Ride the High Iron is a 1956 American drama film directed by Don Weis and starring Don Taylor, Sally Forrest and Raymond Burr.

Plot
A returning Korean War veteran tries to cover-up his humble background when he becomes engaged to a young socialite. Things are complicated by the involvement of self-serving public relations man.

Cast
 Don Taylor as Sgt. Hugo Danielchik 
 Sally Forrest as Elsie Vanders 
 Raymond Burr as Ziggy Moline 
 Lisa Golm as Mrs. Danielchik 
 Otto Waldis as Yanusz Danielchik 
 Nestor Paiva as Yard Boss 
 Mae Clarke as Mrs. Vanders 
 Maurice Marsac as Maurice 
 Bobby Johnson as Porter
 Bess Flowers as Nightclub Patron

References

Bibliography
 Robert J. Lentz. Korean War Filmography: 91 English Language Features through 2000. McFarland, 2016.

External links
 

1956 films
1956 drama films
1950s English-language films
American drama films
Films directed by Don Weis
Columbia Pictures films
American black-and-white films
Television pilots not picked up as a series
1950s American films